There are several formal analogies that can be made between electricity, which is invisible to the eye, and more familiar physical behaviors, such as the flowing of water or the motion of mechanical devices. 

In the case of capacitance, one analogy to a capacitor in mechanical rectilineal terms is a spring where the compliance of the spring is analogous to the capacitance.  Thus in electrical engineering, a capacitor may be defined as an ideal electrical component which satisfies the equation 

where  = voltage measured at the terminals of the capacitor,  = the capacitance of the capacitor,  = current flowing between the terminals of the capacitor, and  = time.

The equation quoted above has the same form as that describing an ideal massless spring:
, where:

 is the force applied between the two ends of the spring,
 is the stiffness, or spring constant (inverse of compliance) defined as force/displacement, and
 is the speed (or velocity) of one end of the spring, the other end being fixed.

Note that in the electrical case, current (I) is defined as the rate of change of charge (Q) with respect to time:

While in the mechanical case, velocity (v) is defined as the rate of change of displacement (x) with respect to time:

Thus, in this analogy:

 Charge is represented by linear displacement, 
 current is represented by linear velocity, 
 voltage by force. 
 time by time

Also, these analogous relationships apply:

 energy.
 Electric power.
 Electrical resistance (R) is analogous to mechanical viscous drag coefficient (force being proportional to velocity is analogous to Ohm's law - voltage being proportional to current).
 Mass (m) is analogous to inductance (L), since  while . Thus an ideal inductor with inductance L is analogous to a rigid body with mass m.

This analogy of the capacitor forms part of the more comprehensive impedance analogy of mechanical to electrical systems.

See also 
 Hydraulic analogy
 Elastance

References 

H.F. Olson, Dynamical Analogies, Van Nostrand, 2 ed, 1958

Classical mechanics
Electrical analogies